Mikheil is a masculine Georgian given name. It may refer to:
Mikheil of Georgia, Georgian royal prince, son of King George XII
Mikheil Saakashvili, Georgian politician, former President of Georgia
Mikheil Janelidze, Georgian politician, former Foreign Minister of Georgia
Mikheil Korkia, Georgian basketball player
Mikheil Gelovani, Georgian actor
Mikheil Mchedlishvili, Georgian chess grandmaster
Mikheil Jishkariani, Georgian football player
Mikheil Javakhishvili, Georgian writer
Mikheil Kavelashvili, Georgian politician, former football player
Mikheil Giorgadze, Georgian water polo player
Mikheil Khutsishvili, Georgian football player
Mikheil Kobakhidze, Georgian film director
Mikheil Meskhi, Georgian football player
Mikheil Meskhi, Georgian football player
Mikheil Ashvetia, Georgian football player
Mikheil Chiaureli, Georgian actor
Mikheil Baghaturia, Georgian water polo player
Mikheil Gachechiladze, Georgian rugby union player
Mikheil Kalatozishvili, Georgian film director
Mikheil Tsinamdzghvrishvili, Georgian academic
Mikheil Bakhtidze, Georgian boxer
Mikheil Potskhveria, Georgian football player
Mikheil Kurdiani, Georgian linguist
Mikheil Makharadze, Georgian politician
Mikheil Kajaia, Georgian wrestler
Mikheil Asatiani, Georgian psychiatrist
Mikheil Batiashvili, Georgian politician
Mikheil Berishvili, Georgian basketball player
Mikheil Tsereteli, Georgian historian
Mikheil Kakhiani, Georgian politician
Mikheil Tsiklauri, Georgian rugby union player
Mikheil Machavariani, Georgian politician
Mikheil Tumanishvili, Georgian theater director
Mikheil Alania, Georgian rugby union player
Mikheil Makhviladze, Georgian football player
Mikheil Bobokhidze, Georgian football player
Mikheil Vashakidze, Georgian astronomer

Georgian masculine given names